YSH may refer to:

 Smiths Falls-Montague Airport (IATA code)
 Yanshi railway station (Pinyin station code), China
 Youth Speaks Hawaii, a program of Hawai'i nonprofit Pacific Tongues